Courting Justice: From NY Yankees v. Major League Baseball to Bush v. Gore, 1997-2000 is a non-fiction book by David Boies, published in 2004 by Miramax Books.

This book covers some of the cases of high-profile attorney David Boies, recounted by Boies in memoir-like style. These cases include Bush v. Gore (2000), United States v. Microsoft, and New York Yankees v. Major League Baseball.

Reviews and Critiques
 David Feige
 CNNMoney.com
 Powells.com
 Amazon.com

Law books
2004 non-fiction books